William Hutchinson was an English priest in the late 16th and early 17th centuries.

Hutchinson  was  educated at St John's College, Oxford.   He held livings at St Mary, Rickmansworth; St Christopher le Stocks, City of London; St. Botolph, Bishopsgate, City of London;  All Saints', Hutton; St Michael Bassishaw, City of London; All Saints',  Castle Camps; St Mary, Cheriton Bishop; and St Andrew, Kenn. He was Archdeacon of St Albans from 1581 until 1602 and Archdeacon of Cornwall from 1603 until his resignation in 1616. Hutchinson was also appointed a prebendary of St Paul's Cathedral in 1589; and a Canon of Exeter in 1608.

References

Archdeacons of St Albans
Alumni of St John's College, Oxford
Archdeacons of Cornwall
16th-century English Anglican priests
17th-century English Anglican priests